Makedonski Shumi ("Macedonian Forest") is a public company from North Macedonia. It was founded on December 15, 1997 and started to work on 1 July 1998.

Symbol and Logo
A symbol has appeared on a filed in the village of Karabinci in Republic of Macedonia. It was unclear what was this symbol but the Director of the Makedonski Shumi Zharko Karadzoski at the time in 2012 has announces that it was the new logo of the company. He also announced the new company slogan: In partnership with nature.

References

Companies of North Macedonia
Macedonian companies established in 1997
Companies based in Skopje